Nayib Lagouireh (born 6 June 1991 in Heusden) is a Belgian footballer who plays as a right winger for Sporting Hasselt. He formerly played for Excelsior, FC Eindhoven, Roda JC Kerkrade and Fortuna Sittard.

Career
Lagouireh left his Belgian youth club Verbroedering Geel to join the Feyenoord Academy in the Netherlands. After playing for Feyenoord's youth teams, he joined Eredivisie club Excelsior. Lagouireh made his professional debut for Excelsior on 7 August 2010. He replaced Tim Vincken in the 74th minute, but couldn't prevent Excelsior losing the season opening away match against De Graafschap (3–0).

References

External links
 Voetbal International profile 

1991 births
Living people
Belgian footballers
Eredivisie players
Eerste Divisie players
Excelsior Rotterdam players
FC Eindhoven players
Roda JC Kerkrade players
Fortuna Sittard players
Belgian expatriate footballers
Expatriate footballers in the Netherlands
Belgian expatriate sportspeople in the Netherlands
Association football wingers
Footballers from Limburg (Belgium)